Bernau am Chiemsee (written ) is a municipality in the district of Rosenheim in Germany on the Lake Chiemsee, and a Luftkurort.

Geography

Topography 
The Luftkurort Bernau lies in the Chiemgau area at the south-western bank of the lake Chiemsee.
Bernau is close to the Bundesautobahn 8 (A 8) Munich – Salzburg and the Rosenheim–Salzburg railway. In the south are the Chiemgau Alps (German: Chiemgauer Alpen) with the prominent summit, the Kampenwand. In the east is vast bogland, where peat used to be harvested in large quantities. An old rail station for the transportation of peat in the bog area Kendlmühlfilzen reminds of these times. Rosenheim is 24km away, Munich 83km, Kufstein 35km, Traunstein 26km, Salzburg 58km and Reit im Winkl 25km.

Bernau has a bathing beach, boat hire as well as mooring for the Chiemsee-Schifffahrt at its shore. It is possible to reach the island Herreninsel directly from here.

The cycling route (Uferrundweg) around the lake Chiemsee also passes through one of Bernau's districts called Felden.

Neighbouring municipality 
Neighbouring municipalities clockwise are Übersee, Grassau, Aschau, Frasdorf and Prien.

Community organisation 
There are the following land plots of the municipality, also called Gemarkungen: Bernau a. Chiemsee, Hittenkirchen. The municipality Bernau am Chiemsee has 38 districts:

History

Before the establishment of the municipality 
Bernau am Chiemsee belonged to the count Grafen von Preysing. However, it was also part of the Electorate of Bavaria. Bernau was a part of the rule of Hohenaschau which was equipped with the right of Blutgerichtsbarkeit. Today's municipality came into being in the course of the administrative reforms in Bavaria by the edict of 1818 (Gemeindeedikt von 1818).

During the time of ancient rome Bernau was a popular resort for soldiers because of its convenient and healthy location. The outlines of a villa rustica were found here. This indicates the existence of an Roman bath. A Roman tombstone was also found.

The emperor Maximilian I. stayed in Bernau during his campaign against the castle Burg Marquartstein in Oktober 1504. This has been noted on a board at the guesthouse Gasthof zum alten Wirt.

Incorporation 
On 1st Mai 1978 parts of the dissolved municipality Hittenkirchen were incorporated.

Population development 
Between 1988 and 2018, the municipality grew from 5,073 to 6,980 by 1,907 inhabitants or alternatively by 37.6%.

Religion 
The majority of the population in Bernau is catholic. Service takes place in the church St. Laurentius which belongs to the catholic parish of Bernau. The district Hittenkirchen has its own village church.

Politics

Municipal council 
20 honorary council members together with the full-time mayor make up the municipal council of Bernau am Chiemsee. The composition of this council following the local elections in 2014 is as follows

Mayor

Local authority finances 
In 2010 the municipal tax revenue was 4,745,000 Euro, 1,676,000 Euro of which were trade tax revenues (net).

Coat of arms and flag 
Blazon: „In Silber über einem mit zwei durchgehenden silbernen Wellenbalken belegten blauen Dreiberg eine grüne Hausmarke, bestehend aus Kreuzkopfvierfußschaft mit erhöhter linker Mittelkreuzstrebe, Vierfuß hintenendig gekreuzt.“
(Silver, at the bottom a blue trimount, with two continuous silver waves going through the mount and above a green House mark consisting of a complex pattern.)

The house mark belongs to the innkeeper family Seiser, who have played an important role in the municipality since the end of the 15th century. The green colour has been freely selected. The trimount alludes to the Aschauer coat of arms who Bernau used to belong to, however, it also stands for the mountains in the Chiemgau area. The waves stand for the position of the town close to lake Chiemsee. The coat of arms was designed by the engineer and designer Hugo Decker and was approved by the Bavarian Ministry of the Interior in 1956.

The flag is striped green, white and blue.

Economy and infrastructure

Economy 
In 2010, according to government statistics, there were 281 employees who were subject to social insurance in the manufacturing industry and 338 employees subject to social insurance in the trade and traffic industry in Bernau. 590 employees subject to social insurance were employed in other economic sectors. Altogether there were 1856 employees subject to social insurance. In the manufacturing sector there were three businesses, and in the building industry proper eight. Furthermore, there were 57 farms with an agricultural land of altogether 1394 hectares, of which 1250 hectares were fields not used for agriculture.

Businesses 
A branch of the company ‘Bavaria Yachts’ is located in Bernau. Furthermore, the specialist clinic Medical Park Chiemseeblick is located in the district Felden.

Traffic 

 Rail traffic: Bernau am Chiemsee is one of the stops (German: Haltepunkt) on the Rosenheim–Salzburg railway route which is part of the main route Munich–Salzburg–Vienna. The train station has two train tracks and two side platforms and were opened together with the railway route on 7 May 1860. In 2003, the train station building was modernised and now also includes a kiosk. There is also the Chiemseeringlinie a bus service with cycle compartment that drives to designated stops in towns and villages around the lake Chiemsee during the summer. During this time, the Chiemsee-Schifffahrt also moors in Felden.

 Bus traffic: Bernau am Chiemsee is services by two bus links which are part of the regional traffic company Regionalverkehr Oberbayern. There is a connection to Aschau im Chiemgau, Sachrang, Prien am Chiemsee, Marquartstein, and Reit im Winkl via the bus route 9502 and 9505.

 road traffic: In the north west lies the Autobahn access point Autobahnanschlussstelle 106 Bernau of the Autobahn A 8 that crosses here with the main road Bundesstraße 305.

Education 
In 2010 there were the following educational institutions:
 Three nurseries with 200 places which were visited by 171 children.
 A primary school with 10 teacher that teach 178 pupils in eight school classes. 
The school teaches grades 1-4 and there are two school classes for each grade.

Sport 
There are many sport facilities in Bernau that allows to try out many different disciplines. These include football, basketball, tennis, paddleball, volleyball, boccia, beach volleyball, beach soccer, ballooning, biking in the mountains, downhill, skiing, snowboarding and other winter sports, as well as hiking, climbing, Nordic walking, ice skating, squash, windsurfing, surfing, sailing, water sports and many other water sports. Furthermore, there are three shooting clubs where it is possible to practice shooting with airguns and air pistols. 

Bernau is home to one of the biggest indoor tennis courts in Germany, as well as one of two place in Germany for the new tennis discipline called Padel. There is also a DAV indoor climbing gym. DAV stands for [German Alpine Club] (German: for Deutscher Alpenverein).
There are beach volleyball and beach soccer courts at the lake. The lake also offers many opportunities for different water disciplines. 
Ballooning is offered in the district of Hittenkirchen, as well as in Bernau itself.

Tourism 

Bernau is a popular place for tourists due to its tranquillity and its proximity to large cities such as Munich and Salzburg. 
Popular tourist spots apart from the lake Chiemsee are the castle Bonnschlössl, the guesthouse Gasthof alter Wirt and the Torfbahnhof, an old rail station for the transportation of peat. There are also many typical Bavarian mountain pastures that are still being run.

There is a tourist information office in the Chiemseepark Bernau-Felden.

Wellness and rehabilitation clinic 
 Medical-Park Chiemsee (a recognized rehabilitation clinic with the specialist areas orthopaedics, traumatology and sports medicine). The clinic is housed in a building which used to be an old Autobahn service area building called Rasthaus am Chiemsee.

Special buildings 
 Parish Church St. Laurentius
 Mediaeval church St. Bartholomäus im Ortsteil Hittenkirchen 
 Hotel Bonnschlössl
 Guesthouse Gasthof Alter Wirt 
 Water tower in Bergham 
 War memorial im Hittenkirchen 
 Statues "Griechische Weisen" in the school yard of the primary school in Bernau 
 Pillar "Seisersäule" at the entrance to the Catholic parish church St. Laurentius 
 Former Autobahn service area building Rasthaus am Chiemsee
 Museum of the old peat train station Torfbahnhof 
 The prison in Bernau (Justizvollzugsanstalt Bernau) can accommodate about 850 inmates and is therefore one of the largest prisons in Bavaria.
 Wayside chapel in Aufing
 Forest chapel near Hitzelsberg 
 Place of prayer Mariengrotte in Kraimoos
 Chapel near Kalvarienberg/Hitzelsberg

Well-known personalities born in Bernau 
 Hugo Decker (1899–1985), member of the German Bundestag MdB (Bavaria Party), Parliamentary leader of the Föderalistische Union (1951–1953)
 Raimund Eberle (1929–2007), jurist and chief administrator (Regierungspräsident) of Upper Bavaria from 1975 to 1994
 Wilfried Klaus (born 1941), actor

Well-known personalities buried in Bernau 
 Karl Chmielewski (1903-1991), German war criminal
 Fritz Odemar (1890–1955), German actor
 Elisabeth Flickenschildt (1905–1977), German actress
 Hans Klein (1931–1996), German politician

References

External links 

 
 Homepage of the municipality Bernau am Chiemsee 
 

Rosenheim (district)
Spa towns in Germany